Tournai-sur-Dive (literally Tournai on Dive) is a commune in the Orne department in north-western France.

Demographics

Tournai-sur Dives during the Second World War
At the centre of the Falaise Pocket, the small village of TOURNAI- sur- DIVES took a very important part in the outcome of the Battle of Normandy.
Just 23 inhabitants stayed in their village with the priest of the commune (parish): l'Abbé Launay.
Some German soldiers lived there as well with their officer.
Everybody was exhausted due to the heat of July and the non-stop bombing of the Allies.
Finally, the priest and the German officer decided to both go the Canadian and Polish battle line near Trun and ask to surrender. They travelled in a tank bearing the red cross and white flag.
However, German officer became afraid to meet Polish soldiers because of their reputation of not taking prisoners, so they changed their objective and went to the American unit in Chambois.
There, Americans kept the German officer as hostage and the abbey returned to Tournai-sur-Dives where all the Germans gave themselves up.
It was the very first day of the end of the Battle of Normandy; 21 August 1944.

See also

Communes of the Orne department
The Battle of Normandy
Falaise Pocket

References

Tournaisurdive